Sam Dalrymple (December 22, 1901 – January 1981) was a former U.S. soccer forward.  Dalrymple earned two cap with the U.S. national team, both at the 1924 Summer Olympics.  The U.S. won the first game, 1-0 against Estonia, but lost the second, against Uruguay, in the quarterfinals.  At some point in his career, he played for Disston A.A.

He was born in Philadelphia, Pennsylvania.

References

1901 births
American soccer players
United States men's international soccer players
Olympic soccer players of the United States
Footballers at the 1924 Summer Olympics
Soccer players from Philadelphia
1981 deaths
Association football forwards